The 2021 Liga 3 Jakarta (also known as Liga 3 MS Glow For Men PSSI DKI Jakarta for sponsorship reason) will be the sixth season of Liga 3 Jakarta as a qualifying round for the national round of the 2021–22 Liga 3.

Jakarta United were the defending champion.

Teams
There are 23 teams participated in the league this season.

Venues
Group A: Cendrawasih Stadium, West Jakarta
Group B: Soemantri Brodjonegoro Stadium, South Jakarta
Group C: Ciracas Stadium, East Jakarta
Group D: Tugu Stadium, North Jakarta

Group stage

Group A

Group B

Group C

Group D

Knockout stage

Quarterfinals

Semifinals

Third place

Finals

References

Liga 3
Sport in Jakarta